The 1991–92 season was the 112th season of competitive football by Rangers.

Overview
Rangers played a total of 55 competitive matches during the 1991–92 season. The team finished first in the Scottish Premier Division and collected the fourth of their nine league titles after winning 33 of their 44 league games.

Rangers won the league by 9 points, the title being won at Ibrox against St.Mirren with a 4–0 victory in April.

Transfer activity was heavily influenced by restrictions imposed by UEFA in European competitions. Match squads could only include a maximum of three foreign nationals, and as a result English players at Ibrox were considered "foreigners". The most significant move was the sale of England international goalkeeper Chris Woods to Sheffield Wednesday. He was replaced by Scotland international goalkeeper Andy Goram from Hibernian.

In the cup competitions, they were knocked out of the Scottish League Cup at the semi-final stage, losing 1–0 to Hibernian. Rangers won the Scottish Cup for the first time since 1981, defeating Airdrieonians 2–1 after a 1–0 win over Celtic in the semi-finals.

In Europe they were knocked out the European Cup in the first round by Czechoslovakian side Sparta Prague. They lost on away goals rule after tying the match 2–2 on aggregate.

Ally McCoist was awarded his first European Golden Boot for finishing as the top goal scorer across all European leagues with 34 goals. The McCoist/Hateley strike partnership yielded an impressive 62 goals during the season.

Transfers

In

Out

Results
All results are written with Rangers' score first.

Scottish Premier Division

European Cup

Scottish Cup

League Cup

Appearances

League table

See also
1991–92 in Scottish football
1991–92 Scottish Cup
1991–92 Scottish League Cup
1991–92 European Cup
Nine in a row

References

Rangers F.C. seasons
Rangers
Scottish football championship-winning seasons